Mansur ibn Bara adh-Dhahabi al-Kamili, (c.1236) was a medieval Muslim metallurgist, chemist and sociologist in Egypt. Among his works are "Chemical aspects of medieval minting in Egypt" (Kashf al-asrar al-cilmiya bidar al-darb al-Misriya).

See also
Jabir ibn Hayyan

References

Alchemists of the medieval Islamic world
13th-century Arabs